The Pittsburg Diamonds were an independent professional baseball team based in Pittsburg, California. Originally named the Pittsburg Mettle, the club changed their name to the Diamonds in 2015.

History 
The Pittsburg Mettle began play as a member of the Pacific Association of Professional Baseball Clubs in 2014. The club rebranded after Khurram Shah, a local businessman, took over for the 2015 season during which the team made news signing former Oakland Athletics slugger Jose Canseco for two separate weekend stints. Pittsburg is managed by former Major League Baseball professional Aaron Miles, who was a part of the 2006 World Series champion St. Louis Cardinals.

In 2016 the Diamonds again signed Canseco, this time to a month-long contract to finish the regular season. Canseco would collect two RBI in 14 plate appearances in addition to making three starts as a pitcher.

The club announced before the 2019 season that it would take a one-year hiatus with plans to return in 2020. However, the team hasn’t returned.

Season-by-season

Notable alumni

 Wayne Franklin (2014)
 Tony Torcato (2014-2015)
 Aaron Miles (2014-2016)
 Tony Phillips (2015)
 Jose Canseco (2015-2017)
 Trent Oeltjen (2016)
 Travis Blackley (2017-2018)

References

External links
 Official website

Pacific Association of Professional Baseball Clubs teams
Professional baseball teams in California
Pittsburg, California